Wang Guangya (born March 1950) is a Chinese diplomat who is the former Director of the Hong Kong and Macau Affairs Office of the State Council of the People's Republic of China. A career diplomat, Wang was previously Vice Minister of Foreign Affairs. He served as Permanent Representative of the People's Republic of China to the United Nations from 2003 to 2008.

Background

Education
Wang studied at Student Center of British Council, The United World College of the Atlantic, and at the London School of Economics in the United Kingdom. He is a graduate from the School of Advanced International Studies at Johns Hopkins University in 1982.

Family
Wang is married to Chen Yi's daughter Cong Jun and has a son.

Career
Wang was appointed Permanent Representative to the United Nations on 25 August 2003. He was President of the United Nations Security Council for the month of February 2004.  On 3 May 2006, when Britain and France introduced a UN Security Council resolution insisting Iran end its nuclear program, Wang commented, "I don't think this draft as it stands now will produce good results. I think it's tougher than expected."

According to a September 2006 profile of Wang in The New York Times Magazine, he was considered the top contender for the post of Minister of Foreign Affairs in Beijing in 2007.

In October 2010 he became the second post-handover director of the Hong Kong and Macau Affairs Office. There have only been two directors for the affairs office.  Wang spends most of his time in Beijing. Though he did make a three-day visit to HK in 2011 to address the Home Ownership Scheme issue.  His working style is very different compared to the previous director Liao Hui who kept silent from public and worked in mystery the 13 years he was in charge of HK.

Controversy

One country two systems comment
Zhao Lianhai was a worker who defended the victims of the 2008 Chinese milk scandal.  On 29 December 2010 Wang Guangya said that because of the One country, two systems Hong Kong should not interfere with the issue.  He then made the controversial statement, "well water (HK) should not mix with river water (China)". Pro-Beijing member Ip Kwok-him then tried to defend the director by saying that HK citizens were only concerned about mainland affairs, and that they do care about One country two systems as well as the mainland justice system. Chief Secretary for Administration Henry Tang was asked to interpret what the water-river statement meant. He only smiled and did not answer. The phrase was first used by former CPC General Secretary Jiang Zemin in December 1989 when he met the Prime Minister of the United Kingdom.  He previously said "Well water should not mix with river water, river water should not mix with well water."

References

External links 
 Wang Guangya biography @ China Vitae, the web's largest online database of China VIPs
 Biography
 Princeton University speech in April 2004
 University of Chicago speech in April 2006 at the University of Chicago's "China and the Future of the World" conference

1950 birthsi]]
Living people
Alternate members of the 17th Central Committee of the Chinese Communist Party
Alumni of the London School of Economics
Chinese Communist Party politicians from Shanghai
Members of the 18th Central Committee of the Chinese Communist Party
Members of the Standing Committee of the 13th National People's Congress
Paul H. Nitze School of Advanced International Studies alumni
People's Republic of China politicians from Shanghai
People educated at Atlantic College
People educated at a United World College
Permanent Representatives of the People's Republic of China to the United Nations